San Juan de Raicedo is a town in the Arenas de Iguña municipality of the Spanish region of Cantabria. The town's population was 138 as of 2004. A Roman church, built during the first half of the 12th century upon older foundations, can be found in this village. The church was registered as a cultural heritage site and has been protected since 2002.

References
Cantabria 102 Municipios (Spanish) http://www.cantabria102municipios.com/besaya/arenas_de_iguna/nucleos.htm

Towns in Spain